The Schempp-Hirth Ventus-3 is a sailplane produced by Schempp-Hirth.  It replaces the highly successful Schempp-Hirth Ventus-2.

Design and development
It was announced at the AERO Friedrichshafen in April 2015 where a mock-up was suspended from the ceiling of the exhibition hall. The prototype flew on 29 January 2016 at Flugplatz Hahnweide at Kirchheim unter Teck in Germany. Production of the first seven turbo Ventus 3T started on 28 April 2016. These competed in the 2017 World Gliding Championships and the 2017 European Gliding Championships. In the latter competition, pilots with Ventus 3T took the first three places in the 18m Class. A Ventus 3T also took first place at the World Championships at Hos%C3%ADn in 2018.

Two sizes of fuselage are now available, Sport and Performance; the latter is larger. The Sport fuselage is available as a pure glider, or with a turbo sustaining engine, or a front-end electric sustaining (FES) engine. Currently the larger fuselage is only available for the self-launching 'M' and the turbo versions. 

The first version of the Sport fuselage with the front electric sustainer engine, Ventus 3F, first flew December 2017. The first version with the Performance fuselage, Ventus 3M, also flew in December 2017. 

Features include 'bug-wiper' garages recessed in the fuselage. There are two ballast tanks (one 58 litres and one 38 litres) in each wing which are filled from the wing-tip and two tanks in the fin. 15m tips are available.

It has been designed to carry more ballast than the Ventus 2 and so its gross weight is 75 kg greater than its predecessor. Its maximum gross weight is now the same to the ASG-29.

Specifications (Ventus-3 Sport or Performance Edition with 18m wings)

Either the turbo engine or the FES engine adds 50kg to the empty weight given above

See also
List of gliders

References

 News

Ventus-3
2010s German sailplanes
Electric aircraft
Motor gliders
T-tail aircraft
Aircraft first flown in 2016